Corel VideoStudio (formerly Ulead VideoStudio) is a video editing software package for Microsoft Windows.

Features

Basic editing
The software allows storyboard and timeline-oriented editing. Various formats are supported for source clips, and the resulting video can be exported to a video file. DVD and AVCHD DVD authoring capabilities are included. Blu-ray authoring is available via a plug-in. VideoStudio supports direct DV and HDV capture and burning.

Transitions
VideoStudio provides several categories of video transitions, including:
FX contains assorted video effects such as 'Burn' and 'Fade to black'
3D provides assorted 3D transition effects.
Album is a slideshow effect similar to that of a photo album.

Overlay
Users can overlay videos, images, and text. Using the overlay track, up to 50 clips can be displayed simultaneously.  It can handle videos in MOV and AVI formats, including alpha channel, and images in PSP, PSD, PNG, and GIF formats. Clips that do not contain an alpha channel can have specific colours removed from the overlay video so that the required background or image is displayed in the foreground.

Other features
VideoStudio can change video playback speed, reverse it, and modify hue and saturation. Trim, crop and split video tools are included. The soundtrack can be split from the video track, allowing the audio to play at a different pace than the video. "SmartRender" renders only the edited video portions, so a user can preview edited footage without creating temporary files. This feature accelerates final rendering.

Proxy video files 
VideoStudio supports high-definition video. Proxy files are smaller versions of the video source that stand in for the full-resolution source during editing to improve performance.

Plug-ins/bundles 
VideoStudio supports VFX-type plug-ins from providers including NewBlue and proDAD.proDAD plug-ins Roto-Pen, Script, Vitascene, and Mercalli-Stabilizer are bundled with X4 and later Ultimate Editions.

Version history 
 1999: Ulead VideoStudio 4.
 2001: Ulead VideoStudio 5.
 2002: Ulead VideoStudio 6.
 2003: Ulead VideoStudio 7.
 2004: Ulead VideoStudio 8.
 2005: Ulead VideoStudio 9.
 2006 : Ulead VideoStudio 10 plus.
 2007: Corel Ulead VideoStudio 11 plus.
 2008 : Corel VideoStudio Pro X2 (v12).
 2010 : Corel VideoStudio Pro X3 (v13).
 2011 : Corel VideoStudio Pro X4 (v14): Add support for : stop motion animation, time-lapse photography, 3D movies, 2nd generation Intel Core.
 2012.03.09 : Corel VideoStudio Pro X5 (v15): Add HTML5 export (Comparison of HTML5 and Flash).
 2013.04.25 : Corel VideoStudio Pro X6 (v16): Windows 8 compatible. Add UHD 4K support.
 2014.03.05 : Corel VideoStudio Pro X7 (v17): Software become 64bits coded.
 2015.05.08 : Corel VideoStudio Pro X8 (v18): Several improvements.
 2016.02.16 : Corel VideoStudio Pro X9 (v19): Windows 10 compatible. Add H.265 support, Multi-Camera Editor, 'Mo wikition tracking' (Match moving).
 2017.02.15 : Corel VideoStudio Pro X10 (v20): Adds Mask Creator, Track Transparency, 360-degree video support.
 2018.02.13 : Corel VideoStudio Pro 2018 (v21): Adds Split Screen Video, Lens Correction, 3D Title Editor.
 2019.02.12 : Corel VideoStudio Pro 2019 (v22): Adds Color Grading, Morph Transitions, MultiCam Capture Lite.
 2020.02.25 : Corel VideoStudio Pro 2020 (v23).
 2021.03.26 : Corel VideoStudio Pro 2021 (v24): Adds Instant Project Templates,AR Stickers,Hardware acceleration support to AMD.
 2022.03.06 : Corel VideoStudio Pro 2022 (v25): Adds Face Effects,Gif Creator,Camera Movements transitions,Speech to text converter,ProRes Smart Proxy.

References

See also 
 Comparison of video editing software

Corel software
Ulead software
Video editing software
Proprietary software
Windows software